Wiener Neustadt North (German: Wiener Neustadt Nord) is a railway station serving Wiener Neustadt.

Notable places nearby
 Wiener Neustadt West Airport

References 

Austrian Federal Railways